Micropentila katangana is a butterfly in the family Lycaenidae. It is found in the Democratic Republic of the Congo (Katanga). The habitat consists of primary forests.

References

Butterflies described in 1965
Poritiinae
Endemic fauna of the Democratic Republic of the Congo